7th OFCS Awards 
January 5, 2004

Best Film: 
 The Lord of the Rings:The Return of the King 
The 7th Online Film Critics Society Awards, honoring films made in 2003, were given on 5 January 2004.

Winners

Best Picture
The Lord of the Rings: The Return of the King
City of God
Kill Bill: Volume 1
Lost in Translation
Mystic River

Best Director
Peter Jackson – The Lord of the Rings: The Return of the King
Sofia Coppola – Lost in Translation
Clint Eastwood – Mystic River
Alejandro González Iñárritu – 21 Grams
Quentin Tarantino – Kill Bill: Volume 1

Best Actor
Bill Murray – Lost in Translation 
Johnny Depp – Pirates of the Caribbean: The Curse of the Black Pearl
Paul Giamatti – American Splendor
Ben Kingsley – House of Sand and Fog
Sean Penn – Mystic River

Best Actress
Naomi Watts – 21 Grams 
Angela Bettis – May
Scarlett Johansson – Lost in Translation
Charlize Theron – Monster
Uma Thurman – Kill Bill: Volume 1

Best Supporting Actor
Peter Sarsgaard – Shattered Glass 
Sean Astin – The Lord of the Rings: The Return of the King
Alec Baldwin – The Cooler
Tim Robbins – Mystic River
Andy Serkis – The Lord of the Rings: The Return of the King

Best Supporting Actress
Shohreh Aghdashloo – House of Sand and Fog
Maria Bello – The Cooler
Patricia Clarkson – Pieces of April
Holly Hunter – Thirteen
Renée Zellweger – Cold Mountain

Best Original Screenplay
Lost in Translation – Sofia Coppola21 Grams – Guillermo Arriaga
In America – Jim Sheridan, Kirsten Sheridan and Naomi Sheridan
Kill Bill: Volume 1 – Quentin Tarantino
The Station Agent – Tom McCarthy

Best Adapted ScreenplayThe Lord of the Rings: The Return of the King – Philippa Boyens, Peter Jackson and Fran WalshAmerican Splendor – Shari Springer Berman and Robert Pulcini
Bubba Ho-Tep – Don Coscarelli
Mystic River – Brian Helgeland
Shattered Glass – Billy Ray

Best Foreign Language FilmCity of God
The Barbarian Invasions
Irreversible
The Man Without a Past
The Triplets of Belleville

Best Documentary
Capturing the Friedmans
The Fog of War
Lost in La Mancha
Spellbound
Winged Migration

Best Animated Feature
Finding Nemo
Cowboy Bebop: The Movie
Looney Tunes: Back in Action
Millennium Actress
The Triplets of Belleville

Best Cinematography
The Lord of the Rings: The Return of the King – Andrew LesnieGirl with a Pearl Earring – Eduardo Serra
Kill Bill: Volume 1 – Robert Richardson
The Last Samurai – John Toll
Winged Migration – Olli Barbé et al.

Best Original ScoreThe Lord of the Rings: The Return of the King – Howard ShoreKill Bill: Volume 1 – RZA
The Last Samurai – Hans Zimmer
Lost in Translation – Brian Reitzell and Kevin Shields
Pirates of the Caribbean: The Curse of the Black Pearl – Klaus Badelt

Best Art DirectionThe Lord of the Rings: The Return of the King
Down with Love
Girl with a Pearl Earring
Kill Bill: Volume 1
Master and Commander: The Far Side of the World

Best Costume Design
The Lord of the Rings: The Return of the King
Down with Love
Girl with a Pearl Earring
Kill Bill: Volume 1
Pirates of the Caribbean: The Curse of the Black Pearl

Best Sound
The Lord of the Rings: The Return of the King
28 Days Later
Kill Bill: Volume 1
Master and Commander: The Far Side of the World
Pirates of the Caribbean: The Curse of the Black Pearl

Best Visual Effects
The Lord of the Rings: The Return of the King
Kill Bill: Volume 1
Master and Commander: The Far Side of the World
Pirates of the Caribbean: The Curse of the Black Pearl
X2

Breakthrough Filmmaker
Shari Springer Berman and Robert Pulcini – American Splendor
Niki Caro – Whale Rider
Fernando Meirelles – City of God
Billy Ray – Shattered Glass
Peter Sollett – Raising Victor Vargas

Breakthrough Performer
Keisha Castle-Hughes – Whale Rider
Peter Dinklage – The Station Agent
Chiwetel Ejiofor – Dirty Pretty Things
Keira Knightley – Bend It Like Beckham
Cillian Murphy – 28 Days Later

References 

2003
2003 film awards